This discography gives an overview of the records published by the German Schlager singer Ralf Bendix.

Singles 

* Columbia

Longplayings

Bibliography 
 Angelika und Lothar Binding: Der große Binding Single Katalog, Volume 1, self edited 1994, (pp. 55).

External links 
 Diskografie bei www.45cat.com

Bendix, Ralf